Brod–Logatec is a former village in western Slovenia in the Municipality of Logatec. It is now part of the town of Logatec. It is part of the traditional region of Inner Carniola and is now included in the Central Slovenia Statistical Region.

Geography
Brod–Logatec is located along both sides of the Logaščica River in the western part of Logatec. Blekova Vas lies to the west, and Čevica and Dolenji Logatec to the east. The soil is gravelly, and the land is subject to flooding during heavy rains.

Name
The name Brod means 'ford' and refers to a location where it was easy to cross the Logaščica River. The name of the village was changed from Brod to Brod–Logatec in 1955.

History
Together with neighboring Gorenji Logatec, Brod was destroyed by a fire on August 8, 1876. Brod had a population of 160 (in 23 houses) in 1880, and 149 (in 24 houses) in 1900. Brod–Logatec was annexed by Logatec in 1972, ending its existence as a separate settlement.

References

External links

Brod–Logatec on Geopedia

Populated places in the Municipality of Logatec
Former settlements in Slovenia